"Cold shoulder" is a phrase used to express dismissal or the act of disregarding someone. Its origin is attributed to Sir Walter Scott in a work published in 1816, which is in fact a mistranslation of an expression from the Vulgate Bible. There is also a commonly repeated incorrect folk etymology.

The expression "cold shoulder" has been used in many literary works, and has entered into the vernacular. It has been used as a description of aloofness and disdain, a contemptuous look over one's shoulder, and even in the context of a woman attempting to decline the advances of an aggressive man. Overall, it remains widely popular as a phrase for describing the act of ignoring someone or something, or giving an unfriendly response.

Etymology

The first recorded use of the expression was in 1816 by Sir Walter Scott in the Scots language, in The Antiquary. This expression is a mistranslation of the Latin phrase dederunt umerum recedentem from the Book of Nehemiah 9.29 from the Vulgate Bible, which actually means "stubbornly they turned their backs on you", which comes from the Septuagint Bible's Greek equivalent ἔδωκαν νῶτον ἀπειθοῦντα. Latin umerus (often misspelled humerus) means both "shoulder" and "back":

Where "cauld" is the equivalent of cold and "shouther" means shoulder, which is further supported by contextual usage in The Antiquary. Neither eating nor food is expressed in the passage, but the phrase is presented in a rather allusive way. The phrase also appears in one of Scott's later works, St. Ronan's Well and after the 1820s it had travelled to America. Dated June 1839 in a letter to the editor in the New England newspaper The Bangor Daily Whig and Courier:

Despite being repeated in several non-academic (non-scientific) books of etymology, the common explanation that the phrase stems from serving a cold shoulder of mutton or other meat to an unwanted guest is an incorrect folk etymology according to linguists.

One source claims that the explanation of the expression is literal: keeping one's back towards, or in the least a shoulder between, a person one was trying to avoid.

See also

 A phrase also coined by Sir Walter Scott, "lock, stock, and barrel"
 Scottish English
 Silent treatment
 Blacklist (employment)

References

Sources

English-language idioms
Shunning